Jack Tippit (October 19, 1923 – October 14, 1994) was an American cartoonist whose work includes the comic strip Amy, which he produced from 1964 through 1991.

Early life
Tippit was born in Texas. He graduated from Texas Technological College (now Texas Tech University) in 1947. He also attended Syracuse University, graduating magna cum laude with a BFA in 1949.

Tippit had a long career in the military, serving as a combat pilot in World War II and as a pilot, trainer, and other roles during the Korean and Vietnam conflicts. He retired from the Air Force Reserve in 1974 with the rank of colonel.

Career
Tippit's cartoons appeared in a number of high-profile publications in the 1960s to 1990s, including The New Yorker, Ladies' Home Journal, Look and The Saturday Evening Post. Tippit's most notable work was on Amy, a cartoon strip created by Harry Mace in 1961 which Tippit took over in 1964 and continued until its end in 1991. He also worked on the strips Henry, Dr. Bill, and Family Flak. He was a co-founder and the first director of the Museum of Cartoon Art (now known as the National Cartoon Museum) in 1974, and served on the National Cartoonists Society Board of Governors.

Death
Tippit died in Lubbock, Texas in 1994.

Awards
He received the National Cartoonist Society Newspaper Panel Cartoon Award for Amy in 1970.  He also received the Society's Gag Cartoon Award for 1963 and 1966.

References

Strickler, Dave. Syndicated Comic Strips and Artists, 1924-1995: The Complete Index. Cambria, CA: Comics Access, 1995. .

External links
NCS Awards

American comic strip cartoonists
American comics artists
Artists from Texas
Texas Tech University alumni
Syracuse University alumni
1923 births
1994 deaths
United States Army Air Forces pilots of World War II
American Korean War pilots
United States Air Force personnel of the Korean War
United States Air Force personnel of the Vietnam War
United States Air Force reservists
United States Air Force colonels